BB&T Corporation (previously known as the Branch Banking and Trust Company) was one of the largest banking and financial services firms in the United States, based in Winston-Salem, North Carolina. In 2019, BB&T announced its intentions to merge with Atlanta-based SunTrust Banks to form Truist Financial.

History
In 1872, Alpheus Branch and Thomas Jefferson Hadley founded the Branch and Hadley merchant bank in their hometown of Wilson, North Carolina. After many transactions, mostly with local farmers, Branch bought out Hadley's shares in 1887 and renamed the company Branch and Company, Bankers. During that same year, the bank also moved to its new headquarters on Nash Street in downtown Wilson, North Carolina. Two years later, Branch, his father-in-law Gen. Joshua Barnes, Hadley, and three other men secured a charter from the North Carolina General Assembly to operate the Wilson Banking and Trust Company. After many more name changes, the company finally settled on the name Branch Banking and Trust Company. Branch remained an active member of the company until his death in 1893. The 1903 Branch Banking and Trust Company Building at Wilson was listed on the National Register of Historic Places in 1978.

BB&T sold Liberty Bonds during World War I and grew to have more than $4 million in assets by 1923. BB&T Insurance Services was added in 1922 and a mortgage division was added in 1923. Even though banks across the United States failed as a result of the 1929 Stock Market Crash, BB&T survived; it was the only one to do so in the town of Wilson. Up until 2008, the CEO was John A. Allison IV.

In 2020, Truist Financial acknowledged and apologized for the company's historic connections to slavery. Kelly King, chairman and chief executive of Truist, issued an employee memo addressing BB&T's slavery ties, but did not mention BB&T's founders Alpheus Branch and Thomas Hadley by name. Prior to the Civil War, Alpheus Branch's father Samuel owned 58 slaves. Thomas Hadley's father owned 37 slaves. The memo stated that "we must consider our own past and acknowledge the role our heritage companies played over 100 years ago to perpetuate the atrocity of slavery and the repression of enslaved people, leading to systemic disadvantages their descendants have endured for generations...We deeply regret and denounce these shameful aspects of our history, both known and unknown." According to the book "Genealogy of American Finance", the economic roots of BB&T can be traced back to 1805, even though BB&T was founded in 1872, nearly a decade after slavery was abolished. Both founders of the bank served in the Confederate Army.

BB&T/SunTrust merger 
On February 7, 2019, It was reported that Winston-Salem-based BB&T and Atlanta-based SunTrust Banks would come together in a merger of equals to create the eighth-largest U.S. bank. It would be the biggest bank deal since the 2007-2009 financial crisis. The bank also announced the move of its headquarters to Charlotte, North Carolina, retaining significant operations in Winston-Salem. It was subsequently announced that Winston-Salem would be the bank's headquarters for community banking, while Atlanta would be the hub for wholesale / retail banking.

On June 12, BB&T and SunTrust announced that the merged company would be called Truist Financial Corporation. This name resulted from research that included hiring Interbrand, seeking opinions of employees of both banks, and focus groups. The new name drew criticism from analysts and customers of both banks on social media. Five days later, Truliant Federal Credit Union of Winston-Salem filed suit claiming "trademark infringement", complaining of potential confusion between the two companies’ respective names, including Truliant products with "Tru" in their names. The parties agreed to dismiss claims on August 5, 2020, and the lawsuit was closed the next day.

The merger was completed at midnight December 6, 2019. BB&T CEO Kelly King retained the same position with the new company. Customers of both banks were given free access to all of Truist's ATMs free of charge. The merged bank will continue to operate under the BB&T and SunTrust names until the two banks' computer hardware, software and networking systems are streamlined, a process that could take as long as two years. Due to delays related to the COVID-19 pandemic, Truist announced in April 2021 that core conversion to combine the branches would be performed in early 2022. However, on the day the merger closed, SunTrust Bank merged into Branch Banking & Trust Company, forming Truist Bank as the merged company's legal banking entity.

On December 11, 2019, Truist officially exercised its option to purchase Hearst Tower in downtown Charlotte from Cousins Properties. Truist moved its corporate headquarters to Hearst Tower, which was renamed Truist Center. The bank announced the deal was completed March 31, 2020. However, due to the COVID-19 pandemic, further actions would be delayed.

Truist unveiled its logo in January 2020, with two Ts representing touch and technology, and a shade of purple combining the blue of SunTrust and the burgundy of BB&T. In November 2020, the bank used helicopters to lift up four signs to the top of the former Hearst Tower. The "Truist" wordmark appears on the North Tryon Street and North College Street sides of the building, while the other two sides displayed the Truist logo.  This signage has caused a lot controversy, even leading the building's original architect to refer to the signage as vandalism.

In February 2020, Truist announced it would be launching a nonprofit foundation called the Truist Foundation.

In March 2020, Truist announced it would vacate its former headquarters building in Winston-Salem except for a branch office and would move employees in its community/retail hub to other locations in the city, including the Park Building on Cherry Street and two locations on Stratford Road.

See also

 BB&T Center
 Truist Financial
 Truist Center
 SunTrust Banks
 BB&T Financial Center
 Southern National Bank
 List of bank mergers in United States
 List of largest banks in the United States

References

Banks based in North Carolina
1872 establishments in North Carolina
2022 disestablishments in North Carolina
Banks established in 1872
Banks disestablished in 2022
2019 mergers and acquisitions
Companies formerly listed on the New York Stock Exchange
Companies based in Winston-Salem, North Carolina
Economy of Winston-Salem, North Carolina
Economy of the Southeastern United States
Defunct banks of the United States